Ablabesmyia peleensis is a species of midge in the family Chironomidae.

References

Further reading

 

Tanypodinae
Articles created by Qbugbot
Insects described in 1926